The economy of the Northern Mariana Islands benefits substantially from financial assistance from the United States and tourism. The rate of funding has declined as locally generated government revenues have grown. An agreement for the years 1986 to 1992 entitled the islands to $228 million for capital development, government operations, and special programs. Since 1992, funding has been extended one year at a time. The Commonwealth received funding of $11 million for infrastructure, for FY96/97 through FY02/03, with an equal local match.:]

Tourism 
A rapidly growing chief source of income is the tourist industry, which now employs around half of the workforce. Chinese and Korean tourists predominate. The agricultural sector is of minor importance and is made up of cattle ranches and small farms producing coconuts, breadfruit, tomatoes, and melons.

Textile industry 

Garment production was an industry back then with the employment of 12,000 mostly Chinese workers and shipments of $1 billion to the United States in 1998 under duty and quota exemptions.  This production is extremely controversial because goods produced in the North Marianas can be labeled "Made in the U.S.A.", although not all American labor laws apply to the commonwealth leading to what critics charge as "sweatshop conditions" for imported, mostly Asian, workers.  Among other companies, the teen clothing store Abercrombie & Fitch has produced some of their clothing in the Northern Marianas and sold them for high prices.:]

The garment industry is changing, though, and many of the garment factories are closing due to the lifting of WTO trade restrictions on Chinese imports. The industry was initially established in the Commonwealth because some U.S. labor and immigration laws do not apply within the CNMI—for example, the CNMI's minimum wage rate of $6.05 per hour (for most employment positions) is lower than the federal rate, which applies to most other areas of the United States.  Additionally, the CNMI retains local control over customs and immigration enforcement, unlike in Guam.

In the late 1990s a number of large American textile companies such as Calvin Klein, Tommy Hilfiger, and Sears were criticized for having manufactured clothes in sweatshop conditions in Saipan. In March 2000, a number of defendants, settled a class action suit brought by Saipanese garment workers, which had alleged mistreatment. As part of the settlement, which involved no admission of wrongdoing, Tommy Hilfiger and other companies agreed to independent oversight of their manufacturing in Saipan, a term refused by other defendants such as Lane Bryant and J.C. Penney.

In 2004 — and in response to a long and expensive class action lawsuit brought by garment workers against various clothing manufacturers — a Garment Oversight Board, aimed at protecting workers' rights, was created. These actions have reportedly resulted in improved conditions since the turn of the 21st century.

Statistics

GDP 
GDP:
purchasing power parity – $524 million (1996 est.)
note:
GDP numbers reflect US spending

GDP – real growth rate:
NA%

GDP – per capita:
purchasing power parity – $9,300 (1996 est.)

GDP – composition by sector:
agriculture:
NA%
industry:
NA%
services:
NA%

Income 
Population below poverty line:
NA%

Household income or consumption by percentage share:
lowest 10%:
NA%
highest 10%:
NA%

Inflation rate (consumer prices):
6.5% (1994 est.)

Labor 
Labor force:
6,006 total indigenous labor force; 2,699 unemployed; 28,717 foreign workers (1995)

Labor force – by occupation:
managerial 20.5%, technical, sales 16.4%, services 19.3%, farming 3.1%, precision production 13.8%, operators, fabricators 26.9%

Unemployment rate:
14% (residents)

Budget:
revenues:
$221 million
expenditures:
$213 million, including capital expenditures of $17.7 million (1996)

Industry 
Industries:
tourism, construction, garments, handicrafts

Industrial production growth rate:
NA%

Electricity 
Electricity – production:
NA kWh

Electricity – production by source:
fossil fuel:
100%
hydro:
0%
nuclear:
0%
other:
0%

Electricity – consumption:
NA kWh

Electricity – exports:
NA kWh

Electricity – imports:
NA kWh

Agriculture 
Agriculture – products:
coconuts, fruits, vegetables, cattle

Exports/Imports
Exports:
$1 billion (1998)

Exports – commodities:
garments

Exports – partners:
US

Imports:
$NA

Imports – commodities:
food, construction equipment and materials, petroleum products

Imports – partners:
US, Japan

Debt – external:
$NA

Economic aid – recipient:
$21.1 million (1995)

Currency 
Currency:
1 United States dollar (US$) = 100 cents

Exchange rates:
US currency is used

Fiscal year:
1 October – 30 September

References

External links 
"Dire Times: Saipan is on The Verge of a Collapse"
"Retirement Fund: For too long too little paid by govt" by William H. Stewart